Hotel Swooni is a 2011 Belgian drama film directed by Kaat Beels.

Cast
 Natali Broods as Vicky
 Enrique De Roeck as Jens
 Sara de Roo as Anna
 Viviane de Muynck as Violette
 Alexander Provoost as Kissing man
 Isaka Sawadogo as Amadou
 Vigny Tchakouani as Joyeux
 Geert Van Rampelberg as Hendrik

References

External links
 

2011 films
2010s Dutch-language films
2010s French-language films
2011 drama films
Belgian drama films
French-language Belgian films